Corwen railway station was a railway station on the Ruabon to Barmouth Line, located in the town of Corwen in Denbighshire, Wales.

Original station
The first station to open was a temporary station to the east of the town, when the line from  opened in October 1864. A permanent station was opened by the Great Western Railway in May 1865.

The station had two platforms and a signal box, and was a passing place on the single track line. Corwen was also the southern terminus of the Denbigh, Ruthin and Corwen Railway (DR&CR), which ran from Rhyl via Denbigh and Ruthin to Corwen, opening in 1864. According to the Official Handbook of Stations, the following classes of traffic were being handled at this station in 1956: G, P, F, L, H and C and there was a 1-ton 10 cwt crane.

The former DR&CR route officially closed in 1963, although the line south of Ruthin was abandoned several years earlier after a landslide. Corwen station itself was scheduled to close under the Beeching Axe to passengers on Monday 18 January 1965, but it closed prematurely on Monday 14 December 1964 due to flood damage west of the station.

The main station building and site survives mainly intact today, in private use since 1990 as a showroom for Ifor Williams Trailers; the trackbed was infilled, both main building wings and the toilets were demolished, and the central section was rebuilt to accommodate a showroom.

New station (Llangollen Railway)
As the original Corwen station is now in private use, and the track bed in between also sub-divided, a new station (Corwen Central) is being built alongside the town.

There was a formal opening ceremony on St David's Day, 1 March 2015, followed by the first full season of trains. Corwen last saw main line passenger trains in 1964. As a final stage, in early 2019 the temporary structure at Corwen East was removed and the line is being extended a further 200 metres to the new permanent station, Corwen Central, constructed next to the town's main car park. The new station features an island platform with two platform edges (accessed via a pedestrian underpass), a headshunt, and a small siding on the same alignment as, and accessed from, the run-round loop. The new station is planned to open in 2023.

References

Further reading

External links 
 Corwen Station coming soon – Llangollen Railway
 Corwen station on navigable 1952 O. S. map

Disused railway stations in Denbighshire
Beeching closures in Wales
Railway stations in Great Britain opened in 1865
Railway stations in Great Britain closed in 1964
Former Great Western Railway stations
Corwen